Benson Everett Legg (born June 8, 1947) is a former United States district judge of the United States District Court for the District of Maryland.

Education and career

Legg was born in Baltimore, Maryland. After receiving his education at the preparatory school Gilman School in Baltimore, graduating in the class of 1966, he earned an Artium Baccalaureus degree from Princeton University in 1970. He went on to obtain a Juris Doctor from the University of Virginia School of Law in 1973 and was admitted to the Maryland bar the same year. From 1973 to 1974, Legg was a law clerk to Judge Frank A. Kaufman of the United States District Court for the District of Maryland and then practiced law privately in Baltimore from 1975 to 1991.

Federal judicial service

On May 15, 1991, he was nominated by President George H. W. Bush to fill a seat on the United States District Court for the District of Maryland vacated by Judge Paul V. Niemeyer. He was confirmed by the United States Senate on September 12, 1991, and received his commission on September 16, 1991. He served as Chief Judge from January 6, 2003 to January 4, 2010. He assumed senior status on June 8, 2012. He retired from active service on February 6, 2013.

References

Sources
 
 

1947 births
Living people
Judges of the United States District Court for the District of Maryland
People from Baltimore
Princeton University alumni
United States district court judges appointed by George H. W. Bush
20th-century American judges
University of Virginia School of Law alumni